Risa Ozaki was the defending champion, but chose to compete in Tokyo instead.

Tamara Zidanšek won the title, defeating Olivia Rogowska in the final, 5–7, 6–1, 6–0.

Seeds

Draw

Finals

Top half

Bottom half

References
Main Draw

Bendigo Women's International - Singles